Puyseguria is a genus of marine bivalve molluscs of the family Neoleptonidae.

Species in the genus Puyseguria
 Puyseguria cuneata Powell, 1927
 Puyseguria prognata Powell, 1927
 Puyseguria tani Powell, 1939

References
 Powell A. W. B., New Zealand Mollusca, William Collins Publishers Ltd, Auckland, New Zealand 1979 

Neoleptonidae
Bivalve genera